William Morris Boustead (3 January 1912 – 15 October 1999) was an Australian Art conservator.
He was conservator at the Art Gallery of New South Wales from 1954 until 1977.

Biography
Boustead was born in Gloucester, New South Wales and educated at Fort Street High School.
His first job after leaving school was working in a metallurgical and chemical laboratory while studying at technical college.

After spending most of the 1930s in the Pacific he served with the Royal Australian Engineers during World War II.
Following his discharge in 1945 Boustead began studying at the National Art School in Sydney.
In 1946 he was appointed to the conservation workshop of the Art Gallery of New South Wales then appointed as gallery conservator in 1954.

Boustead's achievements during his time as conservator at the AGNSW included:
 Building the first vacuum hot table in Australia
 Setting up the first program in Australia to train conservators
 Leading the Australian team as part of the International response to the flooding of Florence in 1966
 Pioneering processes to conserve art works from tropical regions especially Bark Paintings

References

External links
 Biographical cuttings on William Boustead, conservator, containing one or more cuttings from newspapers or journals

1912 births
1999 deaths
People educated at Fort Street High School
Conservator-restorers